Bruce Claridge (died April 17, 1999) was a Canadian football end who played six seasons in the Canadian Football League (CFL) with the BC Lions, Calgary Stampeders, Toronto Argonauts and Edmonton Eskimos. He played college football at the University of Washington. He also played junior football for the Vancouver Blue Bombers. Bruce's brother, Pat, also played in the CFL.

References

External links
Just Sports Stats
Bruce Claridge stats on Sports-Reference.com

Year of birth missing
1999 deaths
Players of Canadian football from British Columbia
Canadian football ends
American football ends
Canadian players of American football
Washington Huskies football players
BC Lions players
Calgary Stampeders players
Toronto Argonauts players
Edmonton Elks players
Canadian football people from Vancouver